Roberton may refer to:

Places
Roberton, Scottish Borders, Scotland
Roberton, South Lanarkshire, Scotland

People
James Roberton, Lord Bedlay, Scottish advocate and judge
James Roberton (1896–1996), New Zealand soldier, doctor and genealogist
Dr Ernest Roberton, one of the founders of the Diocesan school for girls, Auckland
John Roberton (1776) (1776–1840), Physician and social reformer
John Roberton (1797) (1797–1876), Obstetrician and social reformer
Hugh S. Roberton (1874–1952), Scottish composer and founder of the Glasgow Orpheus Choir;
Hugh Roberton (1900–1987), Hugh's son, Australian MP and foundation member for the National Party of Australia
Dylan Roberton (born 1991), AFL player
Elizabeth Roberton, a European settler on Motuarohia Island whose murder was the subject of the trial of Wiremu Kingi Maketu
Thomas Beattie Roberton (1879–1936), Scottish born Canadian journalist